Speedway is an unincorporated community in Mercer County, West Virginia, United States.

The community most likely takes its name from the highway which runs through the town site.

References

Unincorporated communities in Mercer County, West Virginia
Unincorporated communities in West Virginia